Alan Ray Trejo (born May 30, 1996) is an American professional baseball infielder for the Colorado Rockies of Major League Baseball (MLB). He was drafted in the 16th round of the 2017 MLB draft by the Colorado Rockies and made his debut in 2021. He will also be playing for the Mexico national team in the 2023 World Baseball Classic.

Career
Alan Ray Trejo attended Cathedral High School in Los Angeles, and transferred to Warren High School in Downey, California. He enrolled at San Diego State University and played college baseball for the San Diego State Aztecs. He was selected by the Colorado Rockies in the 16th round of the 2017 Major League Baseball draft.

Trejo played 2017 with the rookie ball Grand Junction Rockies, batting .347/.388/.566 with 7 home runs and 32 RBI. The next year he played with the advanced Single-A Lancaster JetHawks, with a batting line of .278/.329/.425 with 10 home runs and a career-high 67 RBI. Trejo spent the 2019 season with the Double-A Hartford Yard Goats, slashing .243/.290/.391 with 15 home runs and 39 RBI in 125 games.

Trejo did not play in a game in 2020 due to the cancellation of the 2020 Minor League Baseball season because of the COVID-19 pandemic. He was added to the Rockies’ 60-man player pool for the 2020 season. He was invited to Spring Training for the 2021 season, but did not make the team and was assigned to Triple-A to begin the season.

On April 10, 2021, Trejo was selected to the 40-man roster and promoted to the major leagues for the first time. He made his MLB debut that day as a pinch hitter in the 9th inning, flying out to Mauricio Dubón in his only at-bat.

References

External links

1996 births
Living people
Baseball players from Los Angeles
Major League Baseball infielders
Colorado Rockies players
San Diego State Aztecs baseball players
Grand Junction Rockies players
Lancaster JetHawks players
Hartford Yard Goats players
Albuquerque Isotopes players
2023 World Baseball Classic players